Sérgio Britto (born Sérgio de Britto Álvares Affonso(September 18, 1959) is a Brazilian musician, best known as a member of the rock band Titãs, for which he contributes with lead vocals, keyboards and, more recently, the bass guitar. He has also released three solo albums.

Childhood 
Sérgio Britto is the only carioca of the group, but left Rio de Janeiro when he was a baby. He lived with his siblings Rui and Gláucia in Brasília when in 1964 the military took over Brazil. Their father, the federal deputy Almino Afonso, head of PTB at the Chamber of Deputies and enemy of the dictatorship had to leave the country in order not to be arrested. One year later, when Sergio's younger brother Fábio was born, they left the country. During his nine years of exile in Chile, he was alphabetized in Castellano.

He grew up listening to Beethoven, Chopin, and other classical music composers, which his father listened to frequently. Until he turned 13, he wished to be a painter. He discovered The Beatles' Help! album, and from there on he would be strongly interested in music. When he was 14, he was back to Brazil and began taking piano lessons. At that time, he listened to Yes, Emerson, Lake & Palmer, The Who, Led Zeppelin, The Beach Boys and much MPB. Meanwhile, he would try to play his sister's guitar.

In São Paulo, he studied at Colégio Equipe. While the others Titãs members took part of festivals and shows, he would compose alone at home or read the texts of Torquato Neto. Those texts helped Britto when composing songs like "Go Back", a hit that would appear in Titãs' debut album. Simultaneously, he would compose the song "Os Olhos do Sol", which was recorded only in 2000, when Britto released his first solo album. At Equipe, he met Arnaldo Antunes and they started to co-write songs. When Titãs unofficially met, in 1981, Britto made his debut in a band.

He once started studying Philosophy at University of São Paulo, but left the course before its end to focus on the music.

Career with and without Titãs 

Britto has co-composed the majority of Titãs' songs, including hits like "Marvin", "Homem Primata", "Comida", "Miséria" and "Epitáfio".

In 1994, Britto formed the band Kleiderman, with the drummer Roberta Parisi and Titãs member Branco Mello. The group released only one album, Con el Mundo a Mis Pies (With the World at my Feet). In 2001, Britto showed his solo works with the album A Minha Cara (My Face), reuniting songs composed by him, with the help of Marcelo Fromer and Arnaldo Antunes.

Five years later, he released another solo CD, called Eu Sou 300 (I am 300).

In 2009, Titãs released Sacos Plásticos, the first album in which Britto played the bass guitar. After original bassist Nando Reis left the group, Titãs hired Lee Marcucci as a session musician from 2002 to 2009. Since then, Britto and Mello have been sharing bass duties, with Britto taking over the bass only on the songs with vocals by Mello.

In 2019, singer Érika Martins released the song "A Verdade Liberta", written by Britto.

Personal life 
Britto lives in São Paulo, is married to Raquel Garrido and is the father of José, born in 1999 and Raquel. He composed one tribute song for each of them in his album Eu Sou 300: "Raquel (DDD)" and "José". In 2007, his daughter Julia was born.

Discography

With Titãs

Solo albums 
 2000 - A Minha Cara (My Face)
 2006 - Eu Sou 300 (I Am 300)
 2010 - SP55

With Kleiderman 
 Con el mundo a mis pies

Guest appearances

References 

 Britto’s page at Titãs official web site

External links
Titãs official website
Sérgio Britto official website 
 

1959 births
Living people
Brazilian keyboardists
20th-century Brazilian male singers
20th-century Brazilian singers
Brazilian songwriters
Brazilian composers
Musicians from Rio de Janeiro (city)
Titãs members
Brazilian rock musicians
Brazilian bass guitarists
Male bass guitarists
Melodica players
University of São Paulo alumni